United Nearshore Operations (UNO) is a global BPO and Customer Engagement Center located in Santiago, Dominican Republic.  It is a leader in Caribbean industry standards for call centers. It has been recognized as "Best Outsourcing Provider" for international awards such as Call Center Week Awards. It has been recognized among the "Best Companies to Work For" by the annual ranking of the Mercado magazine for its handling in the area of Human Resources.

Founded in 2004 by Jose Clase, president of D'Clase Corporation, their corporate parent company which was founded in 1986 as an apparel manufacturing organization. They have grown to include 11 companies with 11,000+ employees serving the U.S. market. The organization has become responsible for integral parts of the infrastructure of the Dominican Republic including the following business sectors: Telecommunications & Communications, Transportation, Banking, Healthcare, Manufacturing and Customer Relationship Management. UNO, Inc. is one of these companies. UNO currently holds 70% of the local contact center market share, therefore being the largest call center service provider in the region.

UNO is PCI DSS level 1 certified company since June 2011.

References

 http://www.lasvegassun.com/community/press-releases/5742/
 http://www.callcenterweekawards.com/DynamicHtml.aspx?pageid=110021&eventid=1000002
 http://www.larazon.com.do/index.php/entretenimiento/sociales/3805-entregan-mencion-de-honor-para-united-nearshore-operations-en-premios-call-center-week-awards
 http://www.teledevelopment.com/teledevelopment-partner-2014-call-center-week-excellence-awards/
 http://www.fairlabor.org/blog/entry/visiting-d%E2%80%99clase-factory-dominican-republic
 Callnet Corp

External links
 

Outsourcing companies
Companies established in 2004